Ana Marija Šetina (born 9 October 1995) is a Slovenian badminton player.

Achievements

BWF International Challenge/Series 
Women's singles

  BWF International Challenge tournament
  BWF International Series tournament
  BWF Future Series tournament

References

External links 
 

1995 births
Living people
Slovenian female badminton players
21st-century Slovenian women